Tebo may refer to:

Tebó, artist signature for art by Sacha Thébaud, a Caribbean-American Artist
Têbo -Tibet
Tebo, Indonesia 
Jared Tebo, American radio-controlled racer